Coats is a town in Harnett County, North Carolina, United States. The population was 2,112 at the 2010 census, and in 2018 the estimated population was 2,464. Coats is a part of the Dunn Micropolitan Area, which is a part of the greater Raleigh–Durham–Cary Combined Statistical Area (CSA) as defined by the United States Census Bureau.

Geography
Coats is located in eastern Harnett County at  (35.406372, -78.669588). North Carolina Highway 55 (McKinley Street) passes through the center of town, leading north  to Angier and south  to Erwin. North Carolina Highway 27 (Stewart Street) crosses NC-55 in the northern part of Coats, leading east  to Benson and west  to Lillington, the Harnett county seat.

Demographics

2020 census

As of the 2020 United States census, there were 2,155 people, 929 households, and 530 families residing in the town.

2000 census
As of the census of 2000, there were 1,845 people, 755 households, and 471 families residing in the town. The population density was 1,341.5 people per square mile (516.2/km2). There were 844 housing units at an average density of 613.7 per square mile (236.1/km2). The racial makeup of the town was 80.22% White, 12.63% African American, 0.27% Native American, 0.65% Asian, 0.05% Pacific Islander, 5.04% from other races, and 1.14% from two or more races. Hispanic or Latino of any race were 11.87% of the population.

There were 755 households, out of which 28.2% had children under the age of 18 living with them, 46.8% were married couples living together, 11.0% had a female householder with no husband present, and 37.6% were non-families. 29.7% of all households were made up of individuals, and 11.1% had someone living alone who was 65 years of age or older. The average household size was 2.44 and the average family size was 2.99.

In the town, the population was spread out, with 23.1% under the age of 18, 13.4% from 18 to 24, 32.7% from 25 to 44, 18.2% from 45 to 64, and 12.6% who were 65 years of age or older. The median age was 32 years. For every 100 females, there were 95.2 males. For every 100 females age 18 and over, there were 96.4 males.

The median income for a household in the town was $26,023, and the median income for a family was $43,274. Males had a median income of $25,296 versus $23,203 for females. The per capita income for the town was $16,468. About 12.1% of families and 21.1% of the population were below the poverty line, including 19.3% of those under age 18 and 25.6% of those age 65 or over.

References

External links
 Town of Coats official website
 The Daily Record

Towns in Harnett County, North Carolina
Towns in North Carolina